The Albasini Dam is a dam located just outside the town of Louis Trichardt, Limpopo Province, South Africa.

The dam was named after João Albasini (1813-1888).

For additional information with regards to fishing at Albasini Dam visit Albasinidam.co.za

See also
 Department of Water Affairs (South Africa)
 List of dams in South Africa
 List of rivers in South Africa

References

Dams in South Africa
Dams completed in 1952